Ivan Steshenko (June 24, 1873, Poltava – August 1, 1918, Poltava) was a Ukrainian civic and political activist, writer, translator, member of the Ukrainian government, and member of the Shevchenko Scientific Society. He had several pen-surnames: Serdeshny, Sichovyk, Svitlenko, and Stepura.

Steshenko had a wife Oksana Steshenko, a daughter and a son: Iryna and Yaroslav. Ivan was a son-in-law to Mykhailo Starytskyi, father of Oksana.

Ivan studied in Kiev University from 1892 to 1896. At that time he was an active member of the Literary Hromada of Kiev. Steshenko was publishing his works in various Lviv periodicals: Pravda, Zoria, and Dzvinok. After graduating from the Department of History and Philosophy in 1896, he worked as a teacher in women's school, gymnasium. In politics he became influenced by Mykhailo Drahomanov and Mykola Kovalevsky. Later together with other activists such as Lesia Ukrainka he formed the Ukrainian social-democratic club (circle). At about that time he wrote his drama Mazepa. After all this he was put in prison in 1897 for four months, following exile from Kiev and prohibition of teaching. That forced him to go into intense writing. At that time he was preparing the Ukrainian dictionary, wrote a book about Kotliarevsky's work (1898), and its own poetry collections such as Khutorni Sonety (Farmstead sonnets, 1899) and Steppovi Motyvy (Steppe Motifs, 1900). He also was publishing various articles in the newspaper Kievskaya Starina.

Upon returning to Kiev, he became the leader of the Hromada society and worked closely with the Society of Ukrainian Progressionists. He also became a secretary of the Kiev Literary-Artistic Society before it was closed in 1905. At about that time he published the biography of Kotliarevsky (1902) and was co-publisher of a magazine Shershen (1905). After he was reinstated as a teacher in 1906, from 1907 to 1917 he was teaching literature in the First Commercial School in Kiev and Lysenko Music and Drama School. During that time he was also a secretary and a deputy-chairman of the Ukrainian Scientific Society. In 1913–14 he was an editor for the Kiev monthly periodical Siayvo, and in 1908 he published a history of Ukrainian drama.

After the October Revolution he was elected as the member of the Kiev Civic Executive Committee and the Tsentralna Rada. Steshenko also was one of the founders of the Society of School Education. Later he was appointed first as the Secretary and then as the Minister of Education. Steshenko also founded the State Academy of Arts. Soon Steshenko was murdered while on vacation. His assassin was never found. Ivan Steshenko was buried in the Baikove Cemetery in Kiev.

Out of his translations were works of Ovid, von Schiller, Pushkin, Byron, and others.

Serhiy Yefremov while on the way to Poltava wrote in his diary: "I just found out from Kost Ivanovych [Tovkach] scary details about the murder of Steshenko. He was charged to be killed by the regional Bolshevik organization of the Zinkiv Povit, and was executed by one of the members of the organization. His name's Bashlovka. The reason why Steshenko was sentenced to be executed is unknown."

References

External links
Biography of Steshenko 
Biography at Ukraine Young 
Individual Terror (anti-Ukrainism) 

Ukrainian male writers
1873 births
1918 deaths
Education ministers of Ukraine
Members of the Central Council of Ukraine
Members of the Shevchenko Scientific Society
Politicians from Poltava
People from Poltava Governorate
Ukrainian Social Democratic Labour Party politicians
Ukrainian Democratic Party (1904) politicians
Taras Shevchenko National University of Kyiv alumni
20th-century male writers
20th-century Ukrainian politicians
Writers from Poltava